Guy's Hospital Reports was a medical journal of clinical practice that was published by Guy's Hospital of London from 1836 to 1974. Initially edited by George H. Barlow, it covered case reports and other topics arising in the large teaching hospital. Other editors have included Sir Henry Greenway Howse.

References

Further reading 
Wilks Samuel; Bettany George Thomas A Biographical History of Guy's Hospital (1892)

Publications established in 1836
Publications disestablished in 1974
English-language journals
General medical journals